Hacıhətəmli (also, Gadzhi-Atamli, Gadzhigatamli, and Gadzhygatamli) is a village and municipality in the Ismailli Rayon of Azerbaijan.  It has a population of 2,421.

References 

Populated places in Ismayilli District